Sathyabhama is an Indian actress in the Kannada film industry. Her films include Golmaal Radhakrishna (1990), Bandhana (1984), and Nanjundi Kalyana (1989).

Career 
Before became an actress in films, she acted in Kannada theatre. She is the daughter of P. Kalinga Rao's nephew. In her 25 years of theatre career, she was widely recognized for her role Rani Chennamma in the drama Veera Rani Chennamma. After watching her performance in the drama, director S. Siddalingaiah offered Sathyabhama a role in his film Hemavathi in 1977, which marked  her entry to films.
Sathyabhama has appeared in more than two hundred Kannada films.

Selected filmography

 Guru Shishyaru (1981)
 Benkiya Bale (1983)
 Karna (1986)
 Krishna Nee Kunidaga (1989)
 Dikska (Hindi) (1989)
 Nammoora Hammera (1990)
 Ganeshana Maduve (1990)
 Ramachaari (1991)
 Golmaal Radhakrishna 2 (1991)
 Hendtheere Hushar (1992)
 Golibar (1993)
 Orange (2018)...Gowramma

See also

List of people from Karnataka
Cinema of Karnataka
List of Indian film actresses
Cinema of India

References

External links 
 

Actresses in Kannada cinema
Living people
Kannada people
Actresses from Karnataka
Actresses from Bangalore
Indian film actresses
21st-century Indian actresses
Actresses in Kannada television
Year of birth missing (living people)